Portsea Passenger Service was a bus operator in Melbourne, Australia. As a Melbourne bus company, it operated four bus routes under contract to the Government of Victoria. A subsidiary of Grenda Corporation, it was purchased by Ventura Bus Lines in January 2012.

History
In February 1983 Portsea Passenger Service was purchased by Grenda Corporation. In January 2012, it was included in the sale of Grenda Corporation to Ventura Bus Lines and the brand was retired.

Fleet
As at April 2014 the fleet consisted of 45 buses coaches. Portsea Passenger Service adopted the same cream and three blues as sister company Peninsula Bus Lines. It later adopted the standard white with red and yellow flashes of Grenda Corporation.

References

Bus companies of Victoria (Australia)
Bus transport in Melbourne
Transport companies disestablished in 2012
2012 disestablishments in Australia